Parry Benjamin Osemwegie Osayande is a retired Deputy Inspector General of police. He was the commissioner of police of the former Bendel state during the Anini saga which terrorised Nigeria in the 1980s. Under his watch as commissioner of police in the now defunct Bendel state, Lawrence Anini, the infamous armed robber was captured and executed. In 1990, Parry Osayande directed the operations which suppressed the Bauchi religious inspired riots in which several people died. In 1992, Osayande led the Federal Government delegation to Namibia under the auspices of the United Nations Transition Assistance Group to monitor the behaviour, conduct and activities of the South West African Police and assist Namibian citizens to hold free and fair elections. Osayande retired as Deputy Inspector General of police in 1992. He was later appointed as Chairman of the Police Service Commission in 2010 by the Goodluck Jonathan administration, a position he held until 2014. Osayande served in several committees set up by the Nigerian Federal Government to reform the Police force.

Early life and education 
Born in Benin City on 29 September 1936 to the family of Chief Osazuwa Osayande. His father was an Agricultural Officer. His mother was Princess Ebose Eweka, a housewife. Parry Osayande schooled at the Immaculate Conception College, Benin City between 1954-1958. During his career as a police officer, Osayande attended several institutions and underwent several trainings. The institutions he attended include Police College, Ikeja which he graduated from in 1960; Detective training school, Wakefield, England which he graduated from in 1962; and Police staff college, Bramshill, England which he graduated from in 1971. Other institutions attended by Osayande include Metropolitan college, Hendon, England; Police Staff College, Jos; Royal Institute of Public Administration, England and National Institute of Policy and Strategic Studies (NIPSS).

Career in the Nigerian Police Force 
Osayande's first appointment in the Nigerian police force was station officer of the central police station, Ibadan in 1961. In the following year, he was part of the armed force sent to contain the Agbekoya uprisings in the defunct Western region. The Agbekoya uprising constituted of people mainly from the present-day South-west geopolitical zone of Nigeria who was agitating for a reduction in taxes. These uprisings led to the death of thousands of people. In 1962, Osayande was appointed Station officer of the central police station, Benin and later that year, he was appointed staff officer at the Ogbomosho Police station. In 1964, he was made staff officer in charge of Training at the state Headquarters in Ibadan. In 1965, Osayande was drafted to the government house, Ibadan as ADC the Governor of the Western Region, Sir Odeleye Fadahunsi. Osayande held this post until the first military coup d'etat in January 1965. After the military takeover, Osayande was made ADC to Lt. Col. Adekunle Fajuyi, Military Governor of the then Western Region. Between 1966 to 1972, Osayande was a Divisional Police Officer of different police divisions in several parts of the country at different intervals. Among these divisions were Ikire division, Lanlate division, Ahoada division, Ogoni division and Diobu Division. During his time as a divisional officer, Osayande went on several operation assignments including Operation (Wet ie) in the defunct western region which culminated in the 1966 coup. During the Nigerian Civil war, Osayande was drafted to the war front in Port Harcourt to take part in the police action against Col. Ojukwu's rebellion. In 1969, he was drafted to aid in the quelling of the Owo riot which led to the deposition of the Olowo of Owo, Olateru Olagbegi II. In 1974, he was made Chief Superintendent of Police at Port Harcourt, a position which lasted until 1975. Between 1978-1978, Osayande held the position of Assistant commissioner in charge of personnel at the Police Headquarters, Lagos. He would later become the Officer in charge of Bendel State Criminal Investigation Department between 1978-1980. In 1981, he was made officer in charge of, Railway Police command, Lagos. According to the former Inspector General of Police, Solomon Arase, "In June 1981, arising from the necessity for the Force to take ownership in the preparation, defence and utilization of its financial resources, the Nigeria Police Budget Unit was established under the headship of Retired DIG Parry Osayande, NPM, CON, the former Chairman of Police Service Commission who was then a Commissioner of Police." Osayande held the position of Commissioner of Police in charge of Police Budget for five years. He would later become Commissioner in charge of Benue state command, Makurdi. Osayande was Commissioner of police in charge of Bendel state in 1986 and Commissioner of Police in charge of Cross River and Akwa Ibom State between 1986 to 1988. In 1990, Osayande was made Deputy Inspector-General of Police in charge of Force Operations at Lagos and later in 1992, he headed the force intelligence and investigation bureau, Lagos. During his time as Deputy Inspector General of Police, Osayande directed the operations which aimed at restoring peace to Bauchi and later on Kano. At this time, religious riots were on the rise in several parts of Northern Nigeria which led to the death of thousands of people. In 1992, Osayande led a police unit to Namibia to ensure a smooth and peaceful election process in Namibia. The police unit led by Osayande was one among 41 police forces across the world which arrived Namibia for the same mission. The year 1992, marked the end of Parry Osayande's career in the Nigerian Police force. He retired from the Police force as Deputy Inspector General of Police.

Anini Saga 
In the 1980s, Lawrence Anini an armed bandit terrorised the Nigerian landscape. Anini hailed from the defunct Bendel state and had a reputation for being armed and highly dangerous. Anini was falsely rumoured to have been sponsored by the Oba of Benin, Oba Erediauwa. Due to his blood relation to the Oba of Benin, Osayande was sent to Benin to arrest Anini. It was one of the earliest episodes in the history of crime detection in the Nigeria Police dating back to 1961 that crime detection became tribalised. Osayande was made Commissioner of Police in charge of Bendel State for a year and on 3 December 1986, Anini was captured. Anini’s arrest team was led by a superintendent of police, Kayode Uanreroro; Gambo Jimeta, a UK-trained detective at the time, was also credited for the success of the operation.

Post-retirement 
After Osayande's retirement in 1992, he continuously made several recommendations when necessary to the Nigerian Federal Government on Police reform. In 2010, under the president Goodluck Jonathan Administration, Osayande was made chairman of the Police service Commission, a position he held until 2014.  Between 2010-2014, Osayande chaired several Committees aimed at the reorganization of the Nigeria Police Force.

Honours and awards 
Parry Osayande has received several awards for his service to Nigeria. Among his awards include the Nigerian Police Medal (NPM); Fellow of the Royal Institute of Public Administration, England (RIPA), Officer of the City of Atmore, USA; Member of the National Institute (MNI) and Distinguished Citizen of Edo state.

Personal life 
Parry Osayande is married to Irene Amayo, both of which have produced five children.

References

Bibliography 
  
 
 
 
 
 
 
 
 
 
 
 
 
 

1936 births
Living people